is the first single by singer Maaya Sakamoto. Released on April 24, 1996, it was her debut single under composer Yoko Kanno. The song and "Tomodachi" appear in her debut anime, The Vision of Escaflowne. Both songs were included on Sakamoto's solo debut Grapefruit, with "Tomodachi" re-recorded in English as "My Best Friend."

Track listing

Charts

References

1996 songs
Maaya Sakamoto songs
Victor Entertainment singles
1996 debut singles
Anime songs
Songs written by Yoko Kanno
Songs with lyrics by Yuho Iwasato